is a Japanese composer best known for her work at the video game company Capcom.

Works

References

External links
 
 Brave Wave profile

1961 births
Capcom people
Japanese composers
Japanese women composers
Japanese women musicians
Living people
Musicians from Osaka Prefecture
People from Tondabayashi, Osaka
Video game composers